Hille is an island in Lindesnes municipality in Agder county, Norway. The island is only accessible by boat, and it has one road which connects the two harbors on the north and east sides of the island. The island has a small permanent population, but it also has many holiday cottages all over the north and east sides of the island.

See also
List of islands of Norway

References

Islands of Agder
Lindesnes